Abdoulaye Kourouma is a Guinean politician  in the National Assembly (Guinea). He is a member of the minority Rally for Renaissance and Development party. He is President of the  Guinea-Korea Association for development

References

Members of the National Assembly (Guinea)
Living people
Year of birth missing (living people)